SS Deutschland may refer to the following steam-powered ships named Deutschland:

 , a steamship wrecked in 1875 and commemorated in the Gerard Manley Hopkins poem "The Wreck of the Deutschland"
 , a transatlantic ocean liner of 1900
 , ocean liner launched 1923 and sunk 1945
 , a steam fishing trawler in service 1934–39, served as the vorpostenboot V 404 Deutschland and V 403 Deutschland 1939–40

See also
 Deutschland (disambiguation)
 
 , a cruise ship christened in 1998

Ship names